Top Pop Catalog Albums is a 50-position weekly albums chart produced by Billboard Magazine which ranks the best-selling catalog albums in the United States, regardless of genre. Billboard defines a catalog title as one that is more than 18 months old and that has fallen below position 100 on the Billboard 200. Albums meeting these criteria are removed from the Billboard Current Albums ranking and begin a new chart run on the Top Pop Catalog Albums chart. Effectively, the Billboard Current Albums is equivalent to the Billboard 200, with the catalog titles removed.

Top Pop Catalog Albums also contains reissues of older albums. An album need not have spent any weeks on the Billboard 200 to be eligible for the Top Pop Catalog Albums chart (this occasionally occurs if an act has a breakthrough release which prompts a significant increase in sales of prior albums that were not big sellers upon their initial release).

The only exception to the "18 months old" rule pertained to holiday releases (for example, Christmas albums). A "holiday" release was initially eligible for the Billboard 200 only during its initial year of release. After its first year, a holiday-related album appeared on Top Pop Catalog Albums. Many consistent sellers made return trips to the Top Pop Catalog Albums chart each November through January. This rule has also been corrected in recent years, as older holiday albums are now allowed to chart on the main Billboard 200 when their performance boosts during the holiday season. Noteworthy examples of this are Michael Bublé's Christmas (2011) and Mariah Carey's Merry Christmas (1994), which in recent years have become staples of the Billboard 200's top ten during holiday seasons, despite both albums having been released years ago.

A unique feature of the chart is the replacement of the "weeks on chart" column (a standard in Billboard's other charts) with a "total weeks" column, which is a cumulative total of weeks an album spent on both the Billboard 200 and the Top Pop Catalog Albums charts. The "total weeks" longevity record (by a large margin) is held by Pink Floyd's The Dark Side of the Moon, which has a cumulative total of over 1,600 chart weeks (more than 31 years). Its closest competitor is Bob Marley's Legend, at more than 975 weeks.

The issue dated July 11, 2009, was the first time any catalog album outsold the number-one album on the Billboard 200. Three of Michael Jackson's albums (Number Ones, The Essential Michael Jackson and Thriller) claimed positions 1-3 respectively on both the Top Pop Catalog Albums and Top Comprehensive Albums charts in the week following Jackson's death. Additionally, eight of the top nine positions on the chart were owned by Jackson, with a ninth held by a Jackson 5 hits collection.

References

External links
Current Catalog Albums Chart

Billboard charts